Elaphoglossum dimorphum, the toothed tongue-fern, is a herbaceous plant, a member of the Dryopteridaceae family.

Distribution 
It is an endemic species to St. Helena.

Taxonomy 
It was named by Joseph Dalton Hooker and Robert Kaye Greville, in  Moore. In: Ind. Fil. 8. in 1857.

References

External links 

 https://www.cabi.org/isc/datasheet/121638
 https://www.researchgate.net/figure/The-three-species-of-Elaphoglossum-endemic-to-St-Helena-Island-E-dimorphum-A-Habit_fig3_225789189
https://www.jstor.org/stable/40648181

Dryopteridaceae